Thirupathi Ezhumalai Venkatesa is a 1999 Indian Tamil-language comedy film directed by Rama Narayanan. The film stars Prabhu, S. Ve. Shekher, Vadivelu, Roja, Urvashi and Kovai Sarala. It was released on 4 December 1999. The film was Rama Narayanan's 100th film and was a hit at the box office. The film was remade in Telugu as Tirumala Tirupati Venkatesa.

Plot

Venkatesa, Ezhumalai and Thirupathi are poor friends who want to become rich at any cost. Nachiappan, a bungalow watchman, has three daughters: Ragini, Padmini and Lalitha. When the owner left the bungalow on vacation, Nachiappan's daughters move into the bungalow. Afterwards, Nachiappan rents his owner's top portion bungalow to Thirupathi, Ezhumalai and Venkatesa who lied about their jobs. The three men eventually marry the three women. The rest of the story is how the three men will manage their wives.

Cast

Prabhu as Venkatesa
S. Ve. Shekher as Ezhumalai 
Vadivelu as Thirupathi 
Roja as Ragini
Urvashi as Padmini 
Kovai Sarala as Lalitha 
Vennira Aadai Moorthy as Nachiappan 
Master Mahendran as Thirumalai/Sonachalam/Udayappa
P. R. Varalakshmi as Alamelu
Alphonsa
Oru Viral Krishna Rao
Vivek in a guest appearance
Chandrasekhar in a guest appearance
R. Sundarrajan in a guest appearance

Soundtrack

The film score and the soundtrack were composed by S. A. Rajkumar. The soundtrack, released in 1999, features 5 tracks with lyrics written by Vaali, Vairamuthu, Palani Bharathi, Kalaikumar and Rama Narayanan. Sarvam Sri Krishnarpanam song were not in film.

Reception
The film received mixed to positive reviews from critics.

Balaji Balasubramaniam of bbthots.com wrote, "Even though Prabhu and Roja get first billing in the credits, its Vadivelu and Sarala who have maximum screen time. Consequently, they figure in the funniest scenes of the movie. Their experience when Vadivelu goes to fill the role of an actor and Sarala fulfilling Vedivelu's mother's vows are the comic highlights of the movie. 'Venniradai' Moorthy has several funny lines and his delivery and timing are good too. S.V.Sekhar, rarely seen in movies, makes us laugh purely because of his dialogue delivery. Prabhu and Roja have the weakest portions of the movie, both with respect to comedy and his plan for correcting her. His scenes with Alphonso(with a song too) are boring and in the end, achieve nothing. Songs are uninteresting and their picturisation is unimaginative."

Remakes
The film was remade in Telugu as Tirumala Tirupati Venkatesa with Roja and Kovai Sarala reprising their roles. The film was also remade in Kannada as Yaarige Beda Duddu.

References

1999 films
Tamil films remade in other languages
1990s Tamil-language films
Indian comedy films
Films directed by Rama Narayanan
Films scored by S. A. Rajkumar
1999 comedy films